Whoa Oh Records is an independent record label based in Astoria, New York.

History
Whoa Oh Records Records was founded in 1998 and is based in Astoria, New York. The label releases Lookout! Records styled pop punk bands, the most notable artists on their roster being Darlington (singer), The Ergs!, The Unlovables, and MC Chris. Other artists they have worked with include Kung Fu Monkeys, Zatopeks, The 20 Belows and Dirt Bike Annie. Their releases have been reviewed by numerous publications.

Roster
 The Ergs!
 Kung Fu Monkeys
 Zatopeks
 The 20 Belows
 Dirt Bike Annie
 The Unlovables
 Darlington

See also
 List of record labels

References

External links
 Official site

American independent record labels
Punk record labels
Record labels established in 1998